Canada is the largest country located in North America and is home to around 357,000 deaf and 3.21 million hard-of-hearing people. The country can be split into Francophone and Anglophone regions, and has both French and English as official languages. The majority of Canada is considered Anglophone and the province of Quebec along with small parts of New Brunswick, Ontario, and Manitoba are primarily French-speaking. The presence of these two main languages and cultures also brings forth different deaf cultures between the two regions. In Francophone regions, the official language used by deaf and hard-of-hearing people is Quebec Sign Language, or Langue des Signes Quebecoise (LSQ).

Sign language 
LSQ is the sign language used by deaf people in the Francophone regions of Canada and is unique to this region. Akin to the contrasts between European French and Canadian French, differences are also present between French Sign Language and LSQ. However, much of LSQ originated from American Sign Language and French Sign Language.

Sign language was introduced to Quebec through religious groups promoting the education of deaf children. The Clercs de Saint-Viateur (Clerks of Saint Viateur) brought over LSQ and teaching techniques from France while the Soeurs de la Providence (Sisters of Providence), having trained in the United States, brought over ASL. These two influences combined to create Quebec Sign Language as it is known today. LSQ is only used by deaf communities in Quebec, making it a deaf community sign language.

Significant organizations 
A main organization that advocates for deaf people in Canada is the Canadian Association of the Deaf or Association des sourds du Canada. This organization represents both the French-speaking and English-speaking regions of Canada. A firm message communicated by this organization is that sign language deserves the same recognition as any other language. They are against the use of other communication forms that have been developed by people who are not in the deaf community like seeing exact English, signed English, and cued speech because these forms take away from the true language of the deaf community and try to conform this population to spoken language. All of these factors taken into consideration, this organization is more centered around empowerment than charity.

An organization that specifically targets the French region of Canada is Audition Quebec (Hearing Quebec). Audition Quebec is a non profit organization found in Quebec that offers referral services and information for adults who have become deaf and also to the people around them. A primary funder for this organization is the Office des personnes handicapees du Quebec (Office of handicapped personnel of Quebec). This organization advocates strongly for the use of technology to combat hearing loss and upholds hearing aids to be their main way of helping the deaf community. Due to the view held by this organization to combat hearing loss as if it is a problem by using techniques that will help people be more typical, it can be attributed to be more of a charity.

L'Association des personnes avec une déficience de l'audition (The association of people with a hearing deficiency) is a non-profit organization focused on helping people live with hearing loss. They target people of all ages with hearing impairments but have a focus on senior citizens. Some services offered by this organization include reception, listening, accompaniment, relationship of help and mutual aid, information and references. The goal of this organization revolves around aiding people with hearing loss integrate better into society and promotes their social inclusion. Other aspects of this organization include, raising awareness for the problems facing the deaf and hard of hearing and advocating for the rights of deaf people in all sorts of settings.

Human and civil rights 
In Quebec, LSQ is currently not a recognized language. The Charter of French Language prohibits and seeks to limit the use of any language other than French, unintentionally including LSQ. Despite persistent efforts to include ASL and LSQ in the Charter of French Language, no action has been taken to recognize the status of sign languages in Quebec. There is further action being taken to ensure the importance of French in Quebec with plans to make modifications to the Charter of French Language through Bill 96. The goal of Bill 96 is to guarantee that French is the only official language in Quebec; this is a rising concern in the deaf and hard of hearing community. Due to this lack of recognition by the Quebec government, provincially legislated aspects like higher education, employment and healthcare is hard to attain for deaf individuals who communicate in LSQ as is seen in later sections.

Convention on the Rights of Persons with Disabilities 
The Convention on the Rights of Persons with Disabilities is a human rights treaty that protects the rights of disabled people. Canada ratified the CRPD in 2010 and is up to date with the reports with the most recent one having been put out in 2017.

The rights of deaf people that is listed in the CRPD include:

Article 13 (Access to Justice): Paragraph 53 of the CRPD takes from Section 14 of the Charter of Rights and grants deaf people in Canada the right to an interpreter in situations where they are in court.

Article 30 (Participation in cultural life, recreation, leisure and sport): Paragraph 73 of the CRPD states that the government of Canada seeks out opportunities to include people with disabilities in sports and leisure activities most prominently by providing funding to organizations like the Canadian Deaf Sports Organization.

Article 8 (Education, promotion and awareness-raising): Paragraph 129 acknowledges that people who are deaf and hard of hearing are required to have trained professionals who have skills such as sign language to administer education.

Article 18 (Freedom of expression and opinion, and access to information): Paragraph 146 states that interpreters must be made available for deaf people when they access government services.

Early hearing detection and intervention 
In Canada, early hearing detection and intervention is a responsibility of each province/territory and it falls under the healthcare sector. There is no national mandate put out by the government of Canada to regulate Newborn Hearing Screening and Early Intervention so it is up to each province or territory to regulate its own Newborn Hearing Screening and Early Intervention.

Quebec's early hearing detection and intervention efforts were graded as insufficient by the Canadian Infant Hearing Task Force. Quebec was set to implement universal screening by the end of 2013. However, as of 2022, only 53% of babies born in Quebec are getting screened for hearing. Although components of Early Hearing Detection and Intervention are present, there is a struggle for it to reach province-wide implementation. Furthermore, there are five components that need to be met in order to have a sufficient grade for EHDI; 1) universal hearing screening of all newborns, 2) identification of babies with permanent hearing loss, 3) intervention services which include support for technology and communication development, 4) family support and monitoring and 5) evaluation of the program. Not all of these criteria are being met by Quebec and what is met is not being met to the highest level.

Early hearing intervention services in Quebec are only available at specialized centers and hospitals spread throughout the province.

Hearing aids are covered for children under the age of 11 under the Quebec Health Insurance Plan if that have hearing loss that gets in the way of full speech capacity and language development. However, eligibility is only determined after extensive testing has been done to measure the extent and level of hearing loss.

Montreal Oral School for the Deaf 
The Montreal Oral School for the Deaf offers intervention services for deaf children of all ages, including early intervention services for children from ages 0–3. They offer services to deaf children and their families to support and guide them right after a diagnosis. The main goal of this organization is to introduce hearing technologies to deaf and hard of hearing children and are strong advocates for the use of assistive devices. With the support of teachers of the deaf, speech-language pathologists, audiologists and social workers, the Montreal Oral School for the Deaf aims to get children integrated into society with spoken language.

Language deprivation 
Given the inadequate Universal Newborn Hearing Screening Program in Quebec that only screens about half the newborns in Quebec, language deprivation can be inferred to be a relevant problem in Quebec. In addition to this, the Health and Social Service Department of Quebec states that without Newborn Hearing Screening, hearing loss is only detected after a child is two years old. The time period from 1–3 years is crucial for language acquisition and it is especially important in the first year of life to receive lots of language input so that certain dimensions of language such as syntax acquisition develop properly. The amount of children that are not screened and identified for hearing loss during the time of infancy are in risk of language deprivation because they are not getting any language input, from spoken language or sign language.

Primary and secondary education 
Given the unrealistic expectations set by the Minister of Education in Quebec that do not represent the reality of deaf people and their struggle with spoken French, there are troubles faced by deaf people in obtaining their secondary study program diploma.  In addition, many of the teachers of the deaf in Quebec are those who know sign language as a second language and don't have as much mastery of it as a deaf person would. In recent years especially, the academic system for the deaf in Quebec has steered towards integrating students towards the hearing academic system.

Three of the most prominent schools for the deaf offering primary and secondary education include École Oraliste, Mackay Centre School and Montreal Oral School for the Deaf. All three institutions dismiss the presence of sign language and focus on spoken language for deaf children.

École Oraliste 
École Oraliste is a special education school located in Quebec city that is centered towards deaf children and preparing them to enter a world of spoken language. The language of instruction is French and this institution believes that in order for deaf children to be successful in the world, they must be proficient in oral and written language. They offer programs on the primary and secondary level and have classes with small ratios and specialized professionals.

Mackay Centre School 
The Mackay School for the deaf is now a part of a provincial special education school that serves children who are deaf and hard-of-hearing along with those who have physical disabilities and communication disorders from ages 4–21. Teachers and speech pathologists aim to introduce children to communication through print and eventually lead them to produce sounds through phonological awareness. They have also implemented a reverse integration program in which hearing children in grades pre-k through grade five are selected to join the school and are taught alongside deaf and physically disabled children.

Montreal Oral School for the Deaf 
The Montreal Oral School for the Deaf is a private special education school that is focused on providing an auditory-verbal education for children with hearing loss. Their purpose is to aid in developing a child's listening and spoken language skills and they base their practices on principles set forth by the Alexander Graham Bell Academy.

Elementary 
Targeted towards children from ages 6–12 years old, this schools aims to combat the language delay that is often faced by deaf children and integrate them into the mainstream schools seamlessly  In accordance with fulfilling the objectives of the Quebec Education Program (QEP), MOSD offers special literary classes and Audiology services to ensure that the child's spoken language skills parallel that of their hearing peers. They work with specialized professionals like teachers of the deaf, behavior specialists, speech-language pathologists and audiologists to ensure this happens.

Higher education 
Only one percent of the population in Quebec is using the college level services that are being offered. Deaf students in Quebec are able to access higher educations through support services like interpreters and notetakers but there is no post-secondary institution present that is specialized towards deaf individuals. Vocational training is also offered in cities to those who have special needs, including those who are deaf.

ASL is what is used primarily in post-secondary programs and adult training programs for the deaf offered throughout Canada, especially with the bilingual bicultural education approach. Programs like such are not viable in Quebec as LSQ stills fails to be recognized as a language in Quebec and due to the main focus of the Quebec academic system to merge deaf students to the hearing world with spoken language .

The Montreal Oral School for the Deaf reports having 80% of students that move onto post secondary education but by pushing deaf students to spoken languages through hearing technologies.

Employment 
In Quebec, 90% of deaf people are unemployed or on social assistance. There are many barriers regarding employment for deaf people in Quebec. This was especially highlighted around 2016, when a restriction regarding deaf people was put out by the Société de l'assurance automobile du Québec. For deaf residents in Quebec, employment through taxi or ride sharing companies is not attainable because they are not allowed to obtain a 4C driver's license that allows this.

Healthcare 
The Eldridge v British Columbia (AG) case in 1997 established that healthcare facilities throughout Canada are required to have interpreting services for deaf individuals. However, the implementation of this has not been very strict, arising many problems for deaf Canadians. Deaf people in Canada are often denied interpreters and they are also often misdiagnosed with other disabilities and mental incompetence which leads to them not being able to have a say in their own treatment and not know what is going on regarding their own healthcare. There is a concern among deaf patients regarding medication safety and other medical risks arising because of inadequate communication between medical professionals and the deaf patient. A major issue affecting the access deaf people have to healthcare is due to the lack of telephone devices for the deaf. This causes a problem regarding initial contact with a doctor's office and may lead to delayed care or a lack of routine care.

For those in Quebec who do not live in a very populated area like Quebec City or Montreal, accessing interpreters is very difficult. The health organizations that exist in more remote areas require the deaf to pay for the interpreter themself and most of them do not budget for this cost, leaving deaf patients without interpreters. They are then left to either pay for their own interpreter, have friends or family help with interpreting or communicate in some other way. Deaf patients in Quebec also have trouble expressing their symptoms and problems due to a lack of vocabulary that covers their symptoms.  In addition to this, due to a lack of knowledge about things like mental health and AIDS, deaf people are prone to not recognize the problems they are facing to even be medical concerns.

Language Endangerment 
LSQ is identified to be a small language with fewer than 10,000 users and is reported to be stable.

See also 

 Deaf life for Indigenous peoples in Canada
 Deafness in Italy
 Deafness in France

References 

Canada, Francophone
Disability in Canada
Deaf culture in Canada